The Queen Elizabeth Academy (formerly Queen Elizabeth School) is a mixed secondary school with academy status. It is located on Witherley Road, Atherstone, Warwickshire, England, and the Principal is Mr N. Harding. The school is dependent on the 6 values.

Atherstone
Secondary schools in Warwickshire
Academies in Warwickshire